Abbott is an English surname, derived from the word "abbot", which may refer to:

A 
 Alan Abbott (1926–2008), English cricketer
 Alfred N. Abbott (1862–1929), American farmer and politician
 Amos Abbott (1786–1868), American Congressman
 Anderson Ruffin Abbott (1837–1913), Canadian physician
 Anne Abbott (1808–1908), American designer and writer
 Anthony Abbott (born 1930), Canadian former politician
 Aubrey Abbott (1886–1975), Australian politician
 Augustus Abbott (1804–1867), British army officer
 Austin Abbott (1831–1896), American lawyer and academic

B 
 Belle K. Abbott (1842–1893), American author
 Benjamin Abbott (1732–1796), American evangelist
 Benjamin Vaughan Abbott (1830–1890), American lawyer and author
 Berenice Abbott (1898–1991), American photographer
 Bert Abbott (1875–1911), English footballer
Brad Abbott (born 1994), English footballer
 Brenden Abbott (born 1962), aka the Postcard Bandit, Australian bank robber
 Bruce Abbott (born 1954), American actor
 Bud Abbott (1897–1974), American actor
 Burton Abbott (1928–1957), American convicted of murder

C 
 Caleb F. Abbott (1811–1855), Canadian politician
 Cecil Abbott (1924–2014), Australian police commissioner
 Cecilia Abbott (born 1959), the First Lady of Texas and wife of Greg Abbott
 Charles Abbott, one of several people including:
 Charles Abbott, 1st Baron Tenterden (1762–1832), English Lord Chief Justice of King's Bench
 Charles Abbott, 3rd Baron Tenterden (1834–1882), British diplomat
 Charles Abbott (footballer) (born 1939), Australian rules footballer
 Charles Conrad Abbott (1843–1919), American archæologist and naturalist
 Charles Greeley Abbot (1872–1973), American astrophysicist, astronomer and Secretary of the Smithsonian Institution
 Charles Lydiard Aubrey Abbott (1937–1946), Australian politician and administrator of the Northern Territory
 Chauncey M. Abbott (1822–1863), American politician
 Chris Abbott (born 1947), American television producer, writer and author
 Christopher Abbott (born 1986), American actor
 Clara Abbott (1857–1924), corporate director of Abbott Laboratories from 1900 to 1908 and from 1911 to 1924
Cory Abbott (born 1995), American baseball player

D 
 Dan Abbott (1862–1930), American baseball player
 Daniel Abbott (1682–1760), Deputy Governor of colony of Rhode Island
 Darrell Lance Abbott (1966–2004), birth name of American guitarist known as Dimebag Darrell
 David Abbott, several people, including:
 David "Tank" Abbott (born 1965), American mixed martial artist
 David Abbott (advertising) (1938–2014), British advertising executive
 David Abbott (magician) (1836–1934), a magician, author and inventor
 Delila (Richards) Abbott (1908–1998), American politician
 Dennis Abbott (born 1941), American politician
 Derek Abbott (born 1960), English physicist and electronic engineer
 Diahnne Abbott (born 1945), American actress and singer
 Diane Abbott (born 1953), British politician, former Shadow Home Secretary
 Dorothy Abbott (1920–1968), American actress
 Douglas Abbott (1899–1987), Canadian politician
 Drew Abbott (born 1947), American musician

E 
 Edith Abbott (1876–1957), American social worker, educator and author
 Edville Gerhardt Abbott (1871–1938), American orthopædic surgeon
 Edward Abbott, several people, including:
 Edward Abbott (clergyman) (1841–1908), American clergyman, journalist and author
 Edward Abbott (jurist) (1766–1832), Australian soldier and politician
 Edwin Abbott (1808–1882), English educator
 Edwin Abbott (public servant) (1878–1947), Australian public servant
 Edwin Abbott Abbott (1838–1926), English schoolmaster and theologian
 Edwin Milton Abbott (1877–1940), American lawyer and poet
 Elenore Abbott (1875–1935), American book illustrator, scenic designer and artist
 Eleanor Hallowell Abbott (1872–1958), American author
 Eli Abbott (1869–1943), American college sports coach
 Emma Abbott (1849–1891), American singer
 Eric Symes Abbott (1906–1983), English clergyman
 Evelyn Abbott (1843–1901), English classical scholar

F 

 Faye Abbott (1895–1965), American football player
 Frank Abbott (disambiguation)
 Fred Abbott (1874–1935), American baseball player
 Frederick Abbott (cricketer) (1901–1952), English cricketer
 Frederick Abbott (Indian Army officer) (1805–1892), English army officer of the East India Company
 Frederick M. Abbott (born 1952), American legal academic
 Frederick Vaughan Abbott (1858–1928), American Army officer and engineer

G 
 George Abbott (disambiguation)
 George (Francis) Abbott (1887–1995), American scriptwriter, producer and director
 George Abbott (ice hockey) (1911–1996), Canadian ice hockey player
George Abbott (politician) (born 1952), Canadian politician
 George Henry Abbott (1867–1942), Australian surgeon
 Glenn Abbott (born 1951), American baseball player
 Gordon Abbott (1914–1986), Australian rules footballer
 Gorham Dummer Abbott (1807–1874), American clergyman, educator and author
 Grace Abbott (1878–1939), American social worker
 Greg Abbott (born 1957), American lawyer and politician, Attorney General of Texas, Governor of Texas
 Greg Abbott (footballer) (born 1963), English footballer
 Gregory Abbott (born 1954), American soul musician, singer, composer and producer
 Gypsy Abbott (1887–1952), American actress

H 
 Hannah Abbott, fictional character from the Harry Potter series
 H. H. Abbott, Harold Henry Abbott (1891–1976), poet and headmaster
 Harold Abbott (1882–1971), New Zealand rugby union footballer
 Henry Abbott (disambiguation), several people
 Herbert Edward Stacy Abbott (1814–1883), British general
 Horace Abbott (1806–1887), American manufacturer

I 
 Ira Abbott (1906–1988), American aerospace engineer

J 
 Jack Abbott, several people, including:
 Jack Abbott (author) (1944–2002), American author and murderer
 Jack Abbott (coach) (1873–1918), American college sports coach
 Jacob Abbott (1803–1879), American writer
 Jacqui Abbott (born 1973), English singer
 James Abbott, several people, including:
 James Abbott (Indian Army officer) (1807–1896), British general and colonial administrator
 James W. Abbott (born 1948), American university administrator and politician
 Jeff Abbott (born 1963), American novelist
 Jeff Abbott (baseball) (born 1972), American baseball player
 Jennifer Abbott (born 1965), Canadian director, cinematographer and editor
 Jeremy Abbott (born 1985), American figure skater
 Jere Abbott (1897–1982), American art historian
 Jerry Abbott (born 1942), American songwriter and record producer
 Jim Abbott, several people, including:
 Jim Abbott (born 1967), American professional baseball player
 Jim Abbott (politician) (1942–2020), Canadian politician
 Joan Stevenson Abbott (1899–1975), Australian army matron
 Job Abbott (1845–1896), Canadian civil engineer
 Joe Abbott (Australian politician) (1891–1965), Australian politician
 Joe Abbott (speedway rider) (1902–1950), English motorcycle racer
 John Abbott, several people, including:
 John Abbott (1821–1893), Canadian prime minister
 John Abbott (actor) (1905–1996), English character actor
 John Abbott (rugby league) (born 1953), Australian rugby league player
 John Farr Abbott (1756–1794), British barrister
 John Stevens Cabot Abbott (1805–1877), American writer
 Josiah Gardner Abbott (1814–1891), American politician
 Joseph Abbott, several people, including:
 Joseph Abbott (clergyman) (1790–1862), Canadian clergyman
 Joseph Abbott (Texas politician) (1840–1908), American politician
 Joseph Carter Abbott (1825–1881), American politician
 Joseph Palmer Abbott (1842–1901), Australian politician and solicitor

K 
 Karen Abbott (born 1973), American author of historical non-fiction
 Kurt Abbott (born 1969), American baseball player
 Kyle Abbott (disambiguation), several people, including:
Kyle Abbott (The Young and the Restless), a fictional character from The Young and the Restless
Kyle Abbott (baseball) (born 1968), former professional baseball player
Kyle Abbott (cricketer) (born 1987), South African cricketer

L 
 L. B. Abbott (1908–1985), American cinematographer, cameraman and special effects expert
 Lawrence Fraser Abbott (1859–1933), American editor and writer
 Lee K. Abbott (1947–2019), American writer
 Lemuel Abbott (1730–1776), English clergyman and poet
 Lemuel Francis Abbott (c. 1760–1802), English portrait painter
 Leonard Dalton Abbott (1878–1953), American publicist and radical thinker
 Lyman Abbott (1835–1922), American religious leader and author

M 
 Mac Abbott (1877–1960), Australian politician
 Margaret Abbott (1878–1955), American golfer
 Margaret Ives Abbott (1878–1955), American golfer
 Mary Bethune Abbott (1823–1898), wife of Canadian prime minister John Abbott
 Maude Abbott (1869–1930), Canadian doctor

 Megan Abbott  (born 1971), American writer

 Mickey Abbott, fictional Seinfeld character
 Mishael Abbott (born 1981), American race car driver
 Monica Abbott (born 1985), American softball player

N 
 Nabia Abbott (1897–1981), American scholar of Islam
 Nathan Abbott (1854–1941), American lawyer and law teacher
 Nehemiah Abbott (1804–1877), American politician
 Nelson Abbott (born 1966), American politician
 Norman Abbott (1922–2016), American television director

O 
 Ody Abbott (1888–1933), American baseball player
 Othman A. Abbott (1842–1935), Canadian-born American politician, first Lieutenant Governor of Nebraska

P 
 P. J. Abbott (born 1964), American race car driver
 Pat Abbott (1912–1984), American golfer
 Paul Abbott (born 1960), English scriptwriter
 Paul Abbott (baseball) (born 1967), American professional baseball player
 Paul Abbott (basketball), basketball coach
 Paul Abbott (footballer) (born 1964), Australian rules footballer
 Paweł Abbott (born 1982), English footballer
 Percy Abbott (1886–1960), founder of Abbott's Magic Novelty Company
 Percy Abbott (Australian politician) (1869–1940), Australian politician, soldier and solicitor
 Percy Abbott (Canadian politician) (1882–1942)
 Peter Abbott (1942–2015), British navy officer
 Philip Abbott (1923–1998), American character actor

R 
 R. Tucker Abbott (1919–1995), American conchologist and malacologist
 Rachel Abbott
 Reg Abbott (born 1930), Canadian ice hockey player
 Richard Abbott (Australian politician) (1859–1940), Australian politician
 Robert Abbott (director) (born 1964), American film director and TV producer
 Robert Abbott (game designer) (1933–2018), American game inventor
 Robert Crowther Abbott (1869–1927), English Anglican bishop
 Robert Sengstacke Abbott (1870–1940), American lawyer and newspaper publisher
 Roger Abbott (1946–2011), Canadian actor

S 
 Samuel Warren Abbott (1837–1904), American physician
 Saunders Alexius Abbott (1811–1894), British general
 Scott Abbott (born 20th century), Canadian co-creator of board game Trivial Pursuit
 Senda Berenson Abbott (1868–1964), Lithuanian basketballer
 Shirley Abbott (ambassador) (1924–2013), American diplomat
 Shirley Abbott (soccer player) (1889–1947), English footballer
Spencer Abbott (ice hockey) (born 1988), Canadian ice hockey player
 Steve Abbott (born 1956), Australian comedian
 Stuart Abbott (born 1978), South African rugby union player

T 
 Tank Abbott (born 1965), American mixed martial artist
 Tarnel Abbott (born 1953), American free-speech advocate, activist and librarian
 Thomas Eastoe Abbott (1786–1854), English poet
 Thomas Kingsmill Abbott (1829–1913), Irish scholar and educator
 Tommy Abbott (1934–1987), American actor, dancer and choreographer
 Tony Abbott (disambiguation), list of people with the name
Ty Abbott (born 1988), American basketball player

V 
Vince Abbott (born 1958), American football player
 Vincent Paul Abbott (1964–2018), birth name of American heavy-metal drummer and producer Vinnie Paul

W 
 Wallace Abbott (1857–1921), founder of Abbott Laboratories, laureate of the American National Business Hall of Fame
 Walter Abbott (disambiguation), several people
 Wes Abbott (born 1971), American artist
 Wilbur Cortez Abbott (1869–1947), American historian and educator
 Wilhelmina Hay Abbott (1884–1957), Scottish suffragist and feminist
 William Abbott, several people, including:
 William Abbott (manager) (1790–1843), American theatre manager
 William Hawkins Abbott (1819–1901), American oilman
 William Louis Abbott (1860–1936), American explorer and collector
 William Osler Abbott (1902–1943), American physician
 Wilson Ruffin Abbott (1801–1876), American-born Canadian businessman

See also 
 Abbott (disambiguation)
 Abbot (surname)

References 

English-language surnames
Occupational surnames
English-language occupational surnames